opened in Hirado, Nagasaki Prefecture, Japan, in 1955. The museum is housed in the 1893 Tsurugamine Mansion of the Matsura family, former daimyō of the Hirado Domain.

See also

 List of Cultural Properties of Japan - paintings (Nagasaki)

References

External links
 Matsura Historical Museum

Museums in Nagasaki Prefecture
Museums established in 1955
1955 establishments in Japan
Hirado, Nagasaki